A daisy grubber is a garden tool that is used to pull out roots.  It is effective because it can pull out deep roots yet cause little or no disturbance to the surrounding soil.

References

Gardening tools